Itamar Willner FRSC is an Israeli chemist who has been a professor at the Hebrew University of Jerusalem since 1986.

He completed his PhD in physical organic chemistry at the Hebrew University of Jerusalem in 1978.

He was awarded the Israel Prize in Chemistry in 2002. He has an h-index of 139.

References

Year of birth missing (living people)
Living people
Hebrew University of Jerusalem alumni
Academic staff of the Hebrew University of Jerusalem
Israel Prize in chemistry recipients
Fellows of the Royal Society of Chemistry
Israeli chemists